The 1921–22 City Cup was the twenty-fourth edition of the City Cup, a cup competition in Northern Irish football.

The tournament was won by Linfield for the 10th time.

Group standings

References

1921–22 in Northern Ireland association football